Angelo Dayu Agor is a South Sudanese politician. As of 2011, he is the Economic Advisor for the state of Central Equatoria.

References

South Sudanese politicians
Living people
Year of birth missing (living people)
Place of birth missing (living people)
People from Central Equatoria